The 1975 Lafayette Leopards football team was an American football team that represented Lafayette College as an independent during the 1975 NCAA Division II football season.

In their fifth year under head coach Neil Putnam, the Leopards compiled a 5–5 record. Mark Jones and John Grimes were the team captains.

Lafayette played its home games at Fisher Field on College Hill in Easton, Pennsylvania.

Schedule

References

Lafayette
Lafayette Leopards football seasons
Lafayette Leopards football